The Brisbane Trades Hall is a former Trades Hall building in Edward Street Brisbane, Queensland, Australia.

First trades hall

The foundation stone of the original trades hall in Turbot Street, Brisbane, was laid on 4 April 1891 by Sir Charles Lilley. There was a procession of unionists from Ann Street, along Queen Street and then up Edward Street to the building site. However, by the 1920s, a larger building was needed as the labour movement had succeeding in unionising about two-thirds of the workforce.

Following on from the extension of the railway line and tunnel underway from Roma Street in 1889 to Central Station, concern with the weight of the first Trades Hall over the tunnel resulted in land resumption, with a new site selected at Upper Edward Street.

Second trades hall

The foundation stone of the second trades hall was laid on 1 May 1920 by the Queensland Lieutenant-Governor William Lennon. The site was on Turbot Street looking down Edward Street, adjacent to Jacob's Ladder.

The building was used by the Queensland trade union movement for meetings, offices, social and educational events, and is the location of the Trades and Labour Council, now known as the Queensland Council of Unions. In the late 1960s, part of the building housed the FOCO club and bookshop, where the group Society for Democratic Action (SDA) met.

In 1984 the Trades and Labour Council, as the board of management, sold the property and moved to a new property at Peel Street, South Brisbane. As the original property was granted for the specific purpose of being used as a Trades Hall, the Brisbane Trades Hall Management Act 1984 was required to be passed authorising the transaction, with planning controls on the use of the original historic building.

The building was subsequently demolished and the site is now occupied by the high-rise IBM building.

References

Trades halls in Australia
Former buildings and structures in Brisbane
 
Demolished buildings and structures in Brisbane
Buildings and structures demolished in 1984